McConachie is a neighbourhood in northeast Edmonton, Alberta, Canada that was established in 2006 through the adoption of the McConachie Neighbourhood Structure Plan (NSP).

McConachie is located within the Pilot Sound residential planning area and was originally considered Neighbourhood 4 within the Pilot Sound Area Structure Plan (ASP).

It is bounded on the west by 66 Street NW, north by Anthony Henday Drive, east by the future realignment of 50 Street NW, and south by 167 Avenue NW.

The community is represented by the Horse Hill Community League, established in 1972.

Demographics 
In the City of Edmonton's 2012 municipal census, McConachie had a population of  living in  dwellings.

Surrounding neighbourhoods

See also 
 Edmonton Federation of Community Leagues

References 

Neighbourhoods in Edmonton